Shlomo Nosson Kotler (1856 – c. 1920) was an orthodox rabbi and Rosh yeshiva, Talmudic scholar, Torah author and Posek (Halachic decisor).

Born in Kovno, Lithuania, Kotler studied in the world-renowned Telz yeshiva under the eminent Rabbi Eliezer Gordon, as well as under Rabbi Jacob Joseph and later in the yeshiva of Rabbi Yaakov Charif, who became his foremost teacher. He received semicha from many great rabbis, among them Rabbi Yitzchak Elchanan Spektor. At the young age of twenty, having already served as a Talmudic lecturer in the Łomża yeshiva, he became one of the first teachers in the famed Knesses Yisroel yeshiva in Slobodke. A few years later, he accepted the position of Av Beth Din in the city of Uzhvent, near Kovno.

In 1893, Kotler's ailing former teacher Joseph, then the chief rabbi of New York City, invited him to serve as his associate. Kotler served as rabbi of Congregation Tiferes Jerusalem in New York in Joseph's stead for the next three years. In 1896, he joined the newly founded Rabbi Isaac Elchanan Theological Seminary as a Rosh yeshiva.

Unsatisfied in an America weak in Orthodox Jewish life and practice, Kotler returned to Europe to serve as rabbi in the cities of Kurshan and Luknik. Before World War I, Kotler returned to America, settling for seven years in Detroit.

Towards the end of his life, Kotler emigrated to Palestine, where his daughter lived. Following Kotler's death, his son-in-law (Rabbi Yaakov Moshe Charlap) renamed his Jerusalem yeshiva in his memory. His great-grandson Zevulun Charlop was the Dean of RIETS many decades later.

Torah Works
Kotler authored numerous Torah articles which were published in the various Torah journals of his time, as well as many sefarim, including the two-volumed responsa Kerem Shlomo (Jerusalem, 1936) and the original work Beis Shlomo (St. Louis, 1927). Many of Kotler's unpublished Torah manuscripts and insights have been lost.

References
YU Torah Online Rosh yeshiva biographies
Orthodox Judaism in America: A Biographical Dictionary

1856 births
1920 deaths
American Orthodox rabbis
Emigrants from the Russian Empire to the United States
Lithuanian male writers
Lithuanian Orthodox rabbis
Rosh yeshivas
Writers from Kaunas
19th-century Lithuanian rabbis